John Child (born May 4, 1967) is a retired professional Canadian male beach volleyball player.

Child began playing beach volleyball in tournaments at age 16, and is a graduate of Centennial College. He played in three Olympic Games; Atlanta in 1996, Sydney in 2000, and Athens in 2004.  He won the bronze medal at the 1996 Summer Olympics, partnering Mark Heese.

John and his partner were the first Canadian team to medal at the Olympics in the sport of volleyball.

Child lives in Toronto, Ontario. He retired at age 38. He was coached by Hernan Humana.

Child now coaches and is the founder of the Leaside Volleyball Club in Toronto.

He is actively involved in the volleyball community, and his children Jenna and Adam also play.

References
 Profile at the Beach Volleyball Database

1967 births
Living people
Canadian men's beach volleyball players
Beach volleyball players at the 1996 Summer Olympics
Beach volleyball players at the 2000 Summer Olympics
Beach volleyball players at the 2004 Summer Olympics
Olympic bronze medalists for Canada
Olympic beach volleyball players of Canada
Olympic medalists in beach volleyball
Centennial College alumni
Volleyball players from Toronto
Medalists at the 1996 Summer Olympics